Pyaozersky is an urban locality (an urban-type settlement) in Loukhsky District of the Republic of Karelia, Russia, located on the shore of Lake Pyaozero,  northwest of Petrozavodsk, the capital of the republic. As of the 2010 Census, its population was 2,098.

History
Urban-type settlement status was granted to it in 1976.

Administrative and municipal status
Within the framework of administrative divisions, the urban-type settlement of Pyaozersky is subordinated to Loukhsky District. As a municipal division, Pyaozersky is incorporated within Loukhsky Municipal District as Pyaozerskoye Urban Settlement.

References

Notes

Sources

Urban-type settlements in the Republic of Karelia
Loukhsky District